"All I Wanted" is a single by the band Kansas.  The song was released on the band's 1986 album Power and written by Steve Walsh and Steve Morse.

Background
It was their 21st single, as well as their seventh (and final) Top 40 appearance and their fourth Top 20 hit, charting at #19 on Billboard's Hot 100 chart. The song takes a more pop approach than the band's previous songs.

Reception
Billboard said that it's "synth-based and relatively mellow."  Cash Box called it a "classic-sounding McCartney composition which elicits memories of some of his strongest material with Wings" with a taut rock beat punctuated by an urgent horn section."

Chart performance

References

1986 singles
Kansas (band) songs
Song recordings produced by Andrew Powell
Songs written by Steve Walsh (musician)
1986 songs